Lisa Anne Novelline  (-een) is an Italian-American author from Lexington, Massachusetts.

Bio
Novelline grew up in Chelmsford, Massachusetts, and is a former ballet dancer who performed with the Boston Ballet. She played the role of Clara in its production of The Nutcracker in 1979 and 1980 and attended Phillips Academy. She lives in Lexington, MA and is the mother of four male children including Ryan Jude Novelline. She graduated with her Master of Education from Harvard University and is a former math teacher and coach of Destination Imagination.

Career
Novelline is the author of the children's book series Piccadilly's Magical World including Piccadilly and the Fairy Polka (2014), Piccadilly and the Waltzing Wind (2016), and Piccadilly and the Jolly Raindrops (2018). Kirkus Reviews described the first book in the series as a "warm, vibrant read", and the series' third book received the International Rubery Book Award for "Best Children's Book". Based on these books, she has made multiple mobile games including Piccadilly’s Magical Storyteller and a jigsaw puzzle app titled Picadilly’s Puzzle Museum. In 2018, she also introduced a plush toy in the shape of a "happy" raindrop named Jolly Raindrop.

She has attended various trade fairs including New York Comic Con (2015-2018), BookExpo America (2017), and Pax East (2019). She also authors the blog Holiday and Hearth that focuses on "family festivals" and gluten-free cooking. She is currently writing "a novel for young adults."

Selected works

References

External links

Holiday and Hearth

American children's writers
American women children's writers
People from Lexington, Massachusetts
21st-century American women writers
American ballerinas
American people of Italian descent
Living people
Harvard Graduate School of Education alumni
People from Chelmsford, Massachusetts
Writers from Massachusetts
21st-century American writers
American bloggers
American women bloggers
Year of birth missing (living people)
Phillips Academy alumni